= Veterstrikdiploma =

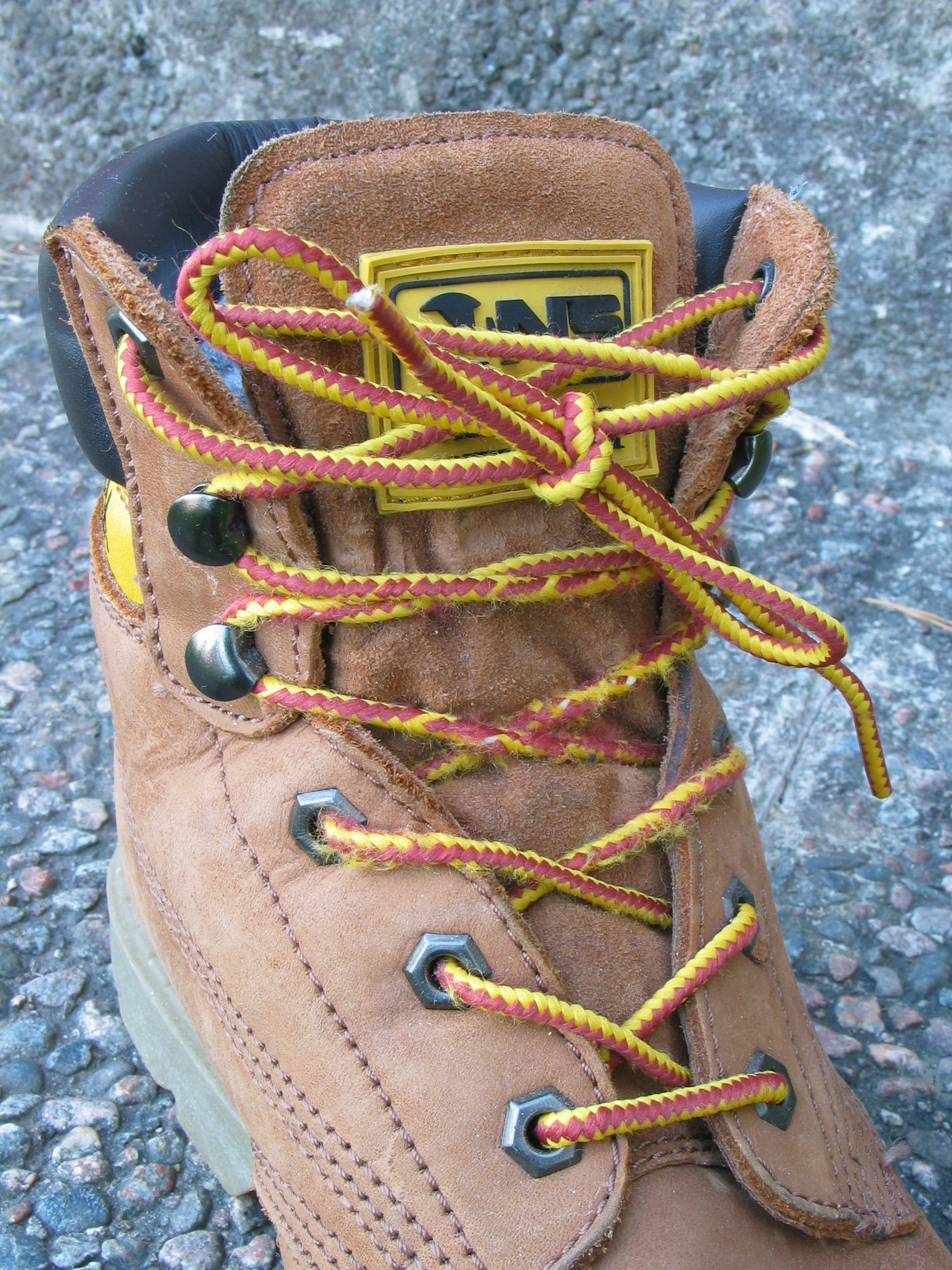

A veterstrikdiploma, also known as veterdiploma or strikdiploma (English: shoelacing diploma) is a diploma which children between 5 and 6 years can get in the Netherlands and Belgium after they manage to tie their shoelaces by themselves. It is often the first diploma a child achieves and thus has an important pedagogic meaning, giving the child their first encounter with learning and the associated rituals.

Veterstrikdiploma is sometimes used as a derogatory term for a diploma or degree which is deemed worthless.
